Inger Andersson (born 8 June 1954) is a Swedish former swimmer. She competed in the women's 100 metre freestyle at the 1972 Summer Olympics.

References

External links
 

1954 births
Living people
Olympic swimmers of Sweden
Swimmers at the 1972 Summer Olympics
Sportspeople from Jönköping
Swedish female freestyle swimmers